The Lake City Classic was a golf tournament on the Ben Hogan Tour. It ran from 1990 to 1992. It was played at Lake City Country Club in Lake City, Florida.

In 1992 the winner earned $25,000.

Winners

External links
Lake City Classic tournament results from GolfObserver.com - Final scores and earnings of each event played from 1990 to 1992

Former Korn Ferry Tour events
Golf in Florida
Recurring sporting events established in 1990
Recurring sporting events disestablished in 1992
1990 establishments in Florida
1992 disestablishments in Florida